Dale is an unincorporated community in Tyler County, in the U.S. state of West Virginia.

History
A post office called Dale was established in 1889, and remained in operation until 1951. The origin of the name Dale is obscure.

References

Unincorporated communities in Tyler County, West Virginia
Unincorporated communities in West Virginia